Sheri Radford is a Canadian author. She was born in New Westminster and raised in Ladysmith. She also lived in Victoria for several years and she currently lives in Vancouver. Radford has written stories, poems, plays, articles and essays. She has a Bachelor of Arts in English and Creative Writing from the University of Victoria. Radford is the editor of Where Vancouver magazine and Where Whistler magazine. She has written two children books called Penelope and the Humongous Burp and Penelope and the Monsters. The third book in the Penelope series, Penelope and the Preposterous Birthday Party, will be published in March 2009. Her books have won several awards.

References

External links
Young Adult Books Central
Official site

Writers from British Columbia
Canadian children's writers
Living people
People from New Westminster
Canadian women children's writers
Year of birth missing (living people)
People from Ladysmith, British Columbia
University of Victoria alumni